Jennifer Jermaine is an American politician and a former Democratic member of the Arizona House of Representatives representing District 18 from 2019 to 2023. She was elected in 2018 to succeed incumbent Republican State Representative Jill Norgaard. She is a member of the White Earth Nation.

She graduated with a Master’s in Public Administration from Arizona State University, and is the founder of Stronger Together Arizona and the We the People Summit.

References

Year of birth missing (living people)
Living people
Democratic Party members of the Arizona House of Representatives
21st-century American politicians
Native American state legislators in Arizona
Native American women in politics
Ojibwe people
White Earth Band of Ojibwe
21st-century American women politicians
Women state legislators in Arizona